Zach Minter (born November 6, 1990) is a Canadian football defensive tackle. He was signed by the Chicago Bears as an undrafted free agent in 2013. He went to Cactus High School, and he later on played college football at Montana State University. He has also been a member of the Dallas Cowboys, Cincinnati Bengals, BC Lions, and Calgary Stampeders.

Early years
He went to Cactus High School. He attended Montana State University. He was selected to the All-West Valley Region, and first-team All-State team. He also was selected to the West Valley Defensive Player of the Year.

Professional career

Chicago Bears
On April 27, 2013, he signed with the Chicago Bears as an undrafted free agent. Minter made his NFL debut in week six against the New York Giants. On November 5, Minter was waived.

Cincinnati Bengals
Minter signed a reserve/future contract with the Cincinnati Bengals on January 6, 2014. He was waived on August 8.

Dallas Cowboys
Minter signed with the Dallas Cowboys on August 14, 2014.

BC Lions 
On March 2, 2015 Minter signed with the BC Lions of the Canadian Football League.

Calgary Stampeders
In July 2016, Minter signed with the Calgary Stampeders.

Saskatchewan Roughriders
Minter signed with the Saskatchewan Roughriders on February 21, 2017.

References

External links
BC Lions bio
Montana State bio
Cincinnati Bengals bio
Chicago Bears bio

Living people
American football defensive tackles
Canadian football defensive linemen
American players of Canadian football
Montana State Bobcats football players
Chicago Bears players
Cincinnati Bengals players
Dallas Cowboys players
BC Lions players
Calgary Stampeders players
Saskatchewan Roughriders players
1990 births
Sportspeople from Glendale, Arizona
Players of American football from Arizona